Brazil – Qatar relations are the bilateral relations between Brazil and Qatar. Diplomatic relations were formed in 1974.

History
Brazil and Qatar formally established bilateral relations on 5 November 1974 – three years after Qatar gained its sovereignty. As neither country had a resident embassy, Qatar was represented by its Permanent Mission to the U.N. in New York while Brazil had representation at its embassy in Abu Dhabi.

Qatar opened an embassy in Brasília in January 1997; this was shut down in March 1999 because Brazil lacked the finances to open its own embassy in Doha. Foreign Minister Celso Amorim visited Qatar in February 2005 to announce the planned creation of a Brazilian embassy in Doha. The plan came to fruition in May of that year. Two years later, in June 2007, the Qatari embassy in Brasília was reinstated.

High level visits
In January 1994, Qatari Foreign Minister Hamad bin Jassim Al Thani visited Brazil, marking the first high-level exchange to occur between the two countries, as well as the only official visit between the two countries in the 20th century. During this visit, the mutual opening of embassies was on the agenda.

Former Emir of Qatar Hamad bin Khalifa Al-Thani became the first Head of State to make an official visit in January 2010. Brazilian President Luiz Inácio Lula da Silva made a return visit to Qatar in May 2010.

Brazil's then-Foreign Minister Antonio Patriota made a trip to Doha in March 2011 where he met with Qatari Emir Hamad bin Khalifa, Qatar's Foreign Minister Hamad bin Jassim, and Al Jazeera Network officials.

In November 2021, Brazilian President Jair Bolsonaro paid an official visit to Qatar.

Economic relations
In 2006, the national air carrier of Qatar and airlines in Brazil agreed to establish frequent flights between each other's capitals. An economic cooperation committee was formed in 2010.

Trade turnover between the two countries has grown by a large margin since the early 2000s. In 2003, the value of trade was only $37 million. From 2007 to 2012, bilateral trade volume was increased by 435%, from $199 million to over $1 billion. Important products exported by Brazil include poultry, beef and vegetables, whereas the chief products exported by Qatar are fossil fuels and fertilizers. Brazil was ranked as Qatar's 18th most significant supplier in 2015.

Cultural relations
Qatar Museums launched the Qatar–Brazil Year of Culture in January 2014. The initiative's inauguration was attended by Qatari government officials and ambassadors from either country who were entertained with capoeira music and a performance from Qatari-based band Doha Jazz. Other events planned as part of the initiative included the screening of Brazilian films at cinemas, Brazilian cuisine exhibitions, and art and fashion exhibitions.

Migration
There are around 900 Brazilian citizens living in Qatar as of 2014.

Resident diplomatic missions
 Brazil has an embassy in Doha.
 Qatar has an embassy in Brasília.

See also
 Foreign relations of Brazil 
 Foreign relations of Qatar

References

External links 
 Embassy of the Federative Republic of Brazil in the State of Qatar
 Embassy of the State of Qatar in the Federative Republic of Brazil

 
Qatar
Brazil